Teresa Bagioli Sickles (1836 – February 5, 1867) was the wife of Democratic New York State Assemblyman, U.S. Representative, and later U.S. Army Major General Daniel E. Sickles. She gained notoriety in 1859, when her husband murdered her lover, Philip Barton Key II, son of Francis Scott Key. At his trial, Sickles claimed for the first time in United States jurisprudence a defense by temporary insanity. He was acquitted.

Early years
Born in New York City in 1836, Teresa Da Ponte Bagioli was the daughter of the wealthy and well-known Italian singing teacher Antonio Bagioli (1795–1871) and his wife, Maria (or Eliza) Cooke (1819–1894). Maria was the adopted and alleged "natural" child of Lorenzo Da Ponte. During her youth, Teresa sometimes lived and studied in the household of her grandfather, Lorenzo da Ponte, the noted music teacher, who had worked as Mozart's librettist on such masterpieces as The Marriage of Figaro.  An exceptionally bright child, she spoke five languages by the time she was a young adult.

Da Ponte's son, a New York University professor, befriended the teenaged Dan Sickles and helped secure him a scholarship to the University.  Young Sickles also moved into the Da Ponte home; he left after about a year when his mentor suddenly died but maintained close ties with the family, possibly to continue the study of French and Italian. Though Sickles had known Teresa since her infancy, he made her acquaintance again in 1851, this time as an Assemblyman. He was thirty-two years old, she was fifteen.

Sickles, a notorious womanizer, was quite taken with Teresa and soon proposed marriage. Despite his prominence and long connection to the family, the Bagiolis refused to consent to the marriage. Undeterred, the couple wed on September 17, 1852, in a civil ceremony.  Teresa's family relented and the couple married again, this time with John Hughes, Catholic Archbishop of New York City, presiding. Some seven months later in 1853, their only child Laura Buchanan Sickles was born.

New York and Washington society
In 1853, Sickles became corporation counsel of New York City, but soon resigned to serve as secretary of the U.S. legation in London under James Buchanan, by appointment of President Franklin Pierce. One source alleges he took a prostitute named Fanny White with him on his overseas assignment, while another source reports that he sent for Teresa after a few months. In any case, he returned to the United States in 1855, where he was elected to the New York Senate, serving from 1856 to 1857.  Following his term, Sickles was elected to the United States House of Representatives, and served as a Democratic representative in the 35th and 36th United States Congress.

In 1856 the Sickles moved to Washington, D.C., where they became quite involved in political society.  Congressman Sickles was very influential and Mrs. Sickles was beautiful and charming. The Sickles hosted formal dinners every Thursday, and Teresa was "at home" (available to callers) to other society ladies every Tuesday morning. With her husband, she attended most of the major social events of the day.  Teresa Sickles, Harper's Weekly reported, quickly became a fixture in Washington society. She was especially celebrated as a hostess who was capable of charming the most sophisticated guest and making the most socially inexperienced feel at home.

The Sickles were reported as becoming good friends of Mary Todd Lincoln and Republican Abraham Lincoln although the congressman from New York was a Democrat. Teresa attended seances held by Mary Todd Lincoln, who was noted for her interest in spiritualism. It was reported that Mary Todd Lincoln gave a necklace engraved "From Mary Lincoln to Laura Sickles" to Teresa's daughter in 1853, early in the parents' friendship.

Affair and murder

As in New York, Sickles continued love affairs in Washington and seriously neglected his marriage. Teresa had a romance of her own with Phillip Barton Key, a U.S. District Attorney and son of Francis Scott Key, the author of "The Star-Spangled Banner".  Philip's uncle was Roger B. Taney, Chief Justice of the United States, and, in 1857, Philip became one of the pillars of the Washington bar. Key followed Teresa everywhere, to her social gatherings as well as to her home.

Dan Sickles eventually received a poison pen letter informing him of his wife's infidelity and investigated further. He discovered the allegations were true, and that Teresa and Key had rented a house for their assignations; it was located within walking distance in a poor, mixed-race part of town.

Enraged at his discovery, Sickles confronted his wife. Although she initially denied everything, Teresa eventually wrote a confession. Teresa described her numerous rendezvous with Key at a rented house on 15th Street. A few days later, on Sunday, February 27, 1859,  Sickles saw Key outside his house, located on the west side of today's Lafayette Square, signaling Teresa with a handkerchief. Key continued walking, and Sickles sent an acquaintance outside to delay him. Sickles armed himself with several pistols, and intercepted Key at the corner of Madison Place N.W. and Pennsylvania Avenue, across the street from the White House. There, Sickles shot the unarmed Key twice, one shot directed at Key's groin. Key died about an hour later in a nearby house.

Daniel Sickles was later acquitted of the murder in the first use of the insanity defense in the U.S.

After the trial and death
Despite pronouncements of forgiveness by both of the Sickles and a brief reconciliation, which caused an outraged public reaction against him, Sickles was effectively estranged from his wife after the trial. Sickles continued to serve in Congress. During the Civil War, he was commissioned as a Union general, receiving the Medal of Honor decades after he lost his lower right leg during the Battle of Gettysburg.

Teresa took ill and died of tuberculosis in 1867 at about the age of thirty-one.
 
Sickles later remarried a young Spanish woman whom he met while he was minister to Spain, and had two children with her.

References

Bibliography
 Teresa Sickles at History of American Women
 Brandt, Nat. The Congressman Who Got Away With Murder (Syracuse, NY: University of Syracuse Press, ca. 1991), 261 pages.

1836 births
1867 deaths
People from New York City
Bagioli, Teresa
American people of Italian descent
19th-century deaths from tuberculosis
19th-century American women
Tuberculosis deaths in New York (state)